The 1984 Baylor Bears football team represented the Baylor University in the 1984 NCAA Division I-A football season.  The Bears finished the season sixth in the Southwest Conference.

Schedule

Team players drafted into the NFL
The following player was drafted into professional football following the season.

References

Baylor
Baylor Bears football seasons
Baylor Bears football